Om Ali, Omali, Umm Ali, or Oumm Ali, meaning "Mother of Ali", is a traditional Egyptian dessert, and is a national dessert of Egypt. There are numerous variations with different composition. The dish, which is traced back to as far as Medieval Egypt, it is named after the wife of the Sultan of Egypt who asked all Egypt's cooks and women to compete and come up with the most delicious dessert that they could create as a form of celebration. The chosen recipe was later distributed throughout the country to celebrate, and became a national dish of Egypt and a traditional Egyptian dessert till this day. It is commonly eaten during Ramadan as part of the iftar or sunset feast.

History 
The Egyptian dessert is said to have originated as a celebration of the death of Shajar al-Durr, who had been married to Egypt's final Sultan from the Ayyubid dynasty, As-Salih, and subsequently to the first of Egypt's Mamluk Sultans, Izz al-Din Aybak. Shajar al-Durr plotted the murder of Aybak, after which she became ruler of Egypt. Ultimately, she was herself killed in retribution, whereafter Aybak's first wife, who was known as Om Ali, asked to have a dessert prepared in celebration. The dessert was popularised throughout the country, and was named after Om Ali.

Recipe 

Typically, pastry (bread, pastry or puff pastry) is divided into pieces and blended with pistachios, coconut flakes, raisins and plenty of sugar. Milk, sometimes with cream, is poured over the mixture, which is then sprinkled with cinnamon. Finally, the mixture is baked in the oven until the surface is golden brown.

It may be eaten hot or cold.

There are another Jordanian and Iraqi different variants known as "khumaiaa".

The dish may be compared to bread and butter pudding, albeit that the latter also includes eggs.

References 

 

 

Egyptian cuisine
Puddings
Milk dishes
Arab desserts